Mitrella alvarezi is a species of sea snail in the family Columbellidae, the dove snails.

References

alvarezi
Gastropods described in 2002